The bead theory is a disproved hypothesis that genes are arranged on the chromosome like beads on a necklace. This theory was first proposed by Thomas Hunt Morgan after discovering genes through his work with breeding red and white eyed fruit flies. According to this theory, the existence of a gene as a unit of inheritance is recognized through its mutant alleles. A mutant allele affects a single phenotypic character, maps to one chromosome locus, gives a mutant phenotype when paired and shows a Mendelian ratio when intercrossed. Several tenets of the bead theory are worth emphasizing :-
1. The gene is viewed as a fundamental unit of structure, indivisible by crossing over. Crossing over take place between genes ( the beads in this model ) but never within them.
2. The gene is viewed as the fundamental unit of change or mutation. It changes in toto from one allelic form into another; there are no smaller components within it that can change.
3. The gene is viewed as the fundamental unit of function ( although the precise function of gene is not specified in this model ). Parts of a gene, if they exist cannot function. Guido Pontecorvo continued to work under the basis of this theory until 
Seymour Benzer showed in the 1950s that the bead theory was not correct. He demonstrated that a gene can be defined as a unit of function. A gene can be subdivided into a linear array of sites that are mutable and that can be recombined. The smallest units of mutation and recombination are now known to be correlated with single nucleotide pairs.

References

 
 An Introduction to Genetic Analysis 7th edition Griffiths AJF, Miller JH, Suzuki DT, et al.
New york W.H. Freeman;2000 
Obsolete biology theories
Genetics